Edward Crompton (February 13, 1889 – September 28, 1950) was an English born Major League Baseball outfielder.

External links

Major League Baseball left fielders
St. Louis Browns players
Cincinnati Reds players
New Castle Nocks players
Johnstown Johnnies players
York White Roses players
Anderson Electricians players
Sportspeople from Liverpool
Major League Baseball players from the United Kingdom
Major League Baseball players from England
English baseball players
1889 births
1950 deaths